Nash's (F. C. Nash & Co.) was a Pasadena, California-based department store which grew into a small chain. Nash's was founded in 1889 by Hammond G. Nash, who developed his grocery on Colorado Street into a full department store. He continued to open locations in nearby towns: 

Alhambra, downtown at 36 W. Main St.
Pomona at Indian Hill Mall, later 450 Pomona Mall, the town's downtown pedestrian mall
West Arcadia at the Arcadia Hub shopping center (1325 S. Baldwin Ave.), current site of L. A. Fitness
Whittier at Whittier Quad, opened 1954
Fullerton, Harbor at Orangethorpe

The Pasadena flagship was located downtown 250 E. Colorado, but burned in a 1976 fire and was a total loss.  The chain was unable to recover from the associated financial losses and closed entirely.

References

Defunct department stores based in Greater Los Angeles
Companies based in Pasadena, California